Dana C. Coolidge (August 22, 1871 – February 27, 1955) was a politician from Wisconsin.

Coolidge was born in St. Cloud, Wisconsin in 1871. He worked for the Eau Claire Leader in his youth. Coolidge married Amy M. Robertson in 1900; she died in 1919. He was elected to the Wisconsin State Assembly in 1906 and 1908. Other positions he held include chairman of the county board of Dunn County, Wisconsin. He was a Republican. Coolidge died on February 27, 1955, at Hill View in Eau Claire, Wisconsin.

Notes

References

People from Fond du Lac County, Wisconsin
People from Dunn County, Wisconsin
Journalists from Wisconsin
County supervisors in Wisconsin
Republican Party members of the Wisconsin State Assembly
1871 births
1955 deaths